Rheumatoid nodulosis is a cutaneous condition associated with rheumatoid arthritis, characterized by the appearance of multiple nodules, most often on the hands.

See also 
 Rheumatoid neutrophilic dermatitis
 Rheumatoid nodule
 List of cutaneous conditions

References 

Connective tissue diseases